William Alexander "Sonny" Greer (December 13, c. 1895 – March 23, 1982) was an American jazz drummer and vocalist, best known for his work with Duke Ellington.

Biography
Greer was born in Long Branch, New Jersey, United States, and played with Elmer Snowden's band and the Howard Theatre's orchestra in Washington, D.C., before joining Duke Ellington, whom he met in 1919. He was Ellington's first drummer, playing with his quintet, the Washingtonians, and moved with Ellington into the Cotton Club. As a result of his job as a designer with the Leedy Drum Company of Indiana, Greer was able to build up a huge drum kit worth over a then-considerable $3,000, including chimes, a gong, timpani, and vibes.

Greer was a heavy drinker, as well as a pool-hall hustler (when he needed to retrieve his drums from the pawnbroker), and in 1950, Ellington responded to his drinking and occasional unreliability by taking a second drummer, Butch Ballard, with them on a tour of Scandinavia. This enraged Greer, and the consequent argument led to their permanent estrangement.

Greer continued to play, mainly as a freelance drummer, working with musicians such as Johnny Hodges, Red Allen, J. C. Higginbotham, Tyree Glenn, and Brooks Kerr, as well as appearing in films, and briefly leading his own band. Greer featured in the 1958 black-and-white photograph by Art Kane known as "A Great Day in Harlem". He was part of a tribute to Ellington in 1974, which achieved great success throughout the United States.

Greer died of a heart attack on March 23, 1982 at Lenox Hill, Manhattan, and is interred in Woodlawn Cemetery in The Bronx, New York City.

Discography
With Duke Ellington
 Duke Ellington (RCA Victor, 1957)
 The Duke in London (Decca, 1957)
 At the Cotton Club (RCA Camden, 1958)
 Caravan (RCA Victor, 1958)
 Jazz Cocktail (Columbia, 1958)
 Johnny Come Lately (RCA Victor, 1967)
 The Duke Elington Carnegie Hall Concerts, January 1943 (Prestige, 1977)

With Johnny Hodges
 Castle Rock (Norgran, 1955)
 Creamy (Norgran, 1955)

With others
 Bernard Addison, High in a Basement (77 Records, 1961)
 Louis Armstrong, Town Hall (RCA Victor, 1957)
 Earl Hines, Once Upon a Time (Impulse!, 1966)
 Lionel Hampton, Lionel Hampton (RCA Victor, 1958)
 Lonnie Johnson, Playing with the Strings (JSP, 2004)
 Brooks Kerr, Soda Fountain Rag (Chiaroscuro, 1974)
 Oscar Pettiford, Oscar Rides Again (Proper, 2008)
 Rex Stewart, Cootie Williams, Tea and Trumpets (His Master's Voice, 1955)
 Victoria Spivey, The Queen and Her Knights (Spivey, 1965)
 Josh White, Sings Ballads, Blues (Elektra, 1957)

References

Bibliography
Ian Carr, Digby Fairweather & Brian Priestley. Jazz: The Rough Guide.

External links
[ Sonny Greer] — brief biography by Scott Yanow, for Allmusic (also contains a [ discography])
 Sonny Greer at Drummerworld.com

 Sonny Greer recordings at the Discography of American Historical Recordings.

1890s births
1982 deaths
People from Long Branch, New Jersey
Swing drummers
American jazz drummers
Duke Ellington Orchestra members
20th-century American drummers
American male drummers
American male jazz musicians
20th-century American male musicians